Hand to Mouth may refer to:

Hand to Mouth (album), 1986 album by General Public
"Hand to Mouth" (song), 1987 song by George Michael
Hand to Mouth, 1987 album by Mickey Raphael
"Hand to Mouth" (Grotus song), 1995 song by the Experimental band Grotus
Hand to Mouth: Living in Bootstrap America, a 2014 book by Linda Tirado
Paul Auster's 1997 autobiography Hand to Mouth
From Hand to Mouth, a 1919 film starring Harold Lloyd